Ivara terryi is a species of sea snail, a marine gastropod mollusk in the family Pyramidellidae, the pyrams and their allies.

Description
The length of the shell attains 3.2 mm.

Distribution
This marine species occurs in the following locations:
 Caribbean Sea
 Colombia
 Gulf of Mexico
 Mexico
 Panama

References

 Rosenberg, G., F. Moretzsohn, and E. F. García. 2009. Gastropoda (Mollusca) of the Gulf of Mexico, Pp. 579–699 in Felder, D.L. and D.K. Camp (eds.), Gulf of Mexico–Origins, Waters, and Biota. Biodiversity. Texas A&M Press, College Station, Texas.

External links
 To World Register of Marine Species

Pyramidellidae
Gastropods described in 1958